Teej is the generic name for a number of Hindu festivals that are celebrated by women and girls.  and  welcome the monsoon season and are celebrated primarily by girls and women, with singing, dancing, enjoyment and prayer rituals. The monsoon festivals of Teej are primarily dedicated to Parvati and her reunion with Lord Shiva. Women often fast in celebration of Teej.

Hartalika Teej is celebrated in hilly and terai regions of Nepal and most of the parts of North India (Bihar, Uttar Pradesh, Madhya Pradesh, Uttarakhand, and Rajasthan). Teej festivals are traditionally observed by women to celebrate the monsoons during the months of Shravan and Bhadrapada of Hindu calendar. Women pray to Parvati and Shiva during Teej.

Etymology

 refers to the third day that falls every month after the new moon, and the third day after the full moon night of every lunar month. According to Kumar (1988),  and  fall in Bhadrapada.

 refers to the monsoon festivals, observed particularly in western and northern states of India and Nepal. The festivals celebrate the bounty of nature, arrival of clouds and rain, greenery and birds with social activity, rituals and customs. The monsoon festival in Rajasthan is dedicated to Parvati.

Types of 
 festivals are traditionally observed by women to celebrate the monsoons during the months of Shravan and Bhadrapada in the Hindu calendar. Women often pray to Parvati and Shiva during Teej.

(lit. Green Teej) is celebrated on the third day after the new moon in the month of Shraavana/Sawan (of the Hindu calendar).

The  festival is also celebrated to remember the reunion of Shiva and Parvati, the day when Shiva accepted Parvati as his wife. Parvati fasted and was austere for many years and was accepted by Shiva as his wife in her 108 birth. Teej mother).

On  married daughters receive the gifts by her mother such clothes, bangles, bindi, mehandi, etc. , a special sweet, are given to them on this day. According to Bhatnager (1988),  is derived from the Sanskrit word "Sringar" which means 'decoration of women and their charming beauty'. These gifts include sweets, henna, new bangles, and a new dress. The rich send expensive gifts. The unmarried girls also receive new clothes and articles of decoration.

Observance of 

Haryali teej is celebrated in Punjab, Haryana and Rajasthan. The festival is also celebrated in Chandigarh.

Chandigarh 
Chandigarh administration makes special arrangements for  celebration in the Rock Garden in the city. School children present plays and other cultural programs on this day. The female members of the family, especially daughters, are given gifts and dresses.

Haryana 
 is one of the famous festivals of Haryana, and is celebrated as an official holiday. Many functions are organised by the Government of Haryana to celebrate this festival, which welcomes the rainy season. Boys traditionally flew kites from morning to evening, though this tradition is losing its charm in big cities due to high rise buildings and lack of terrace space.

Swings are set up in open courtyards, under trees for the season. Girls apply henna to their hands and feet and are excused from household chores on this day. On , girls often receive new clothes from their parents.

The puja is performed in the morning. The evenings are set aside for folk singing and dancing, including the women's prayers for their husbands' longevity and their families.

Punjab 

 is known as Teeyan in Punjab and is seen as a seasonal festival which is dedicated to the onset of the monsoon. The festival is celebrated by women of all faiths, and lasts from the third day of the bright half of the lunar month of Sawan as per the Bikrami calendar (Punjabi calendar) to the full moon of Sawan (about 13 days). Teeyan involves women getting together and performing Gidda, married women visiting their families and receiving gifts. It is also traditional for women to ride on swings.

Fairs are organised in schools and colleges where dance competitions are held.

 is a festival when girls play on swings that are set up under trees or open courtyards. During , family members give gifts, typically new clothes and accessories, to girls and women. Sweets are prepared especially ghevar in some parts of Punjab.

Rajasthan
 welcomes the monsoon and observed in the month of Shravan (July/August). The monsoon rains fall on the parched land and the pleasing scent of the wet soil rises into the air. Swings are hung from trees and women dressed in green clothes sing songs in celebration of the advent of the monsoon.

This festival is dedicated to Parvati, commemorating her union with Shiva. Parvati is worshipped by seekers of conjugal bliss and happiness. An elaborate procession is taken out in Jaipur for two continuous days on the festive occasion which is watched by people in large numbers. The  idol is covered with a canopy whereas the Gangaur idol is open. The traditional ghevar sweet is also associated with the festival.

During , Parvati is worshiped. The day before , is celebrated as Sinjara, wherein women put mehandi on their hands and eat.

is celebrated in the Bikrami lunar month of Bhadrapud: the third day of the dark fortnight of Bhadrapada.  is also called . In Rajasthan,  is called  (lit. Smaller Teej).

The focus of the lyrics is usually on separation expressing the pining of a woman for her beloved in her parents' home, where she has been sent to celebrate , or waiting in anticipation to be collected by brothers to celebrate . The kajri is a folk song composed and sung in the regions of eastern Uttar Pradesh, Bihar and in parts of Madhya Pradesh and Rajasthan.

The fast is broken by eating sattu. The other focus of the day is to pray to the neem tree. A fair is held in Bundi in Rajasthan to celebrate .

On the third day of the bright half of Bhadrapud, Parvati made a  out of sand and silt of Ganga and prayed. Shiva was so impressed that he gave his word to marry Parvati. Eventually, Parvati was united with Shiva and was married to him with her father's blessing.

Accordingly,  is seen as a major festival and is celebrated on the third day of the bright half of the Indian/North Nepali Lunar month of Bhadrapud. The focus is on praying to Parvati whom Shiva desired should be worshipped under the name Hartalika. The main areas of celebration are Bihar, Rajasthan, Uttar Pradesh and Uttarakhand,. In Rajasthan, an idol of Parvati is taken out in procession in the streets accompanied by singing, and music.  has also spread to parts of Madhya Pradesh, Chhattisgarh .

In Maharashtra Hartalika teej also known as Hartalika tritiya vrat, which is celebrated in similar manner like northern India. It is observed by married women for the welfare, health, and long life of their husbands and for a happy married life and unmarried girls for being blessed with a good husband. It is Nirjala Vrat, they fast for one and half day.
Women do Sola shrungar, apply mehendi, wear new red or green sari observe fast, make idol of shiva, gauri, sakhi and ganesh with clay or river sand, read katha.
They do bhajan sangeet pooja in night as well and open vrat on the second day.
It is very auspicious vrat for women in India to worship goddess Parvati in the form of Gouri along with shiva parivar.

Elsewhere in India

(also called Akshaya Tritiya) falls on the third day after full moon in the month of Vaisakha. It is an auspicious day of the birthday of Parasurama, the sixth incarnation of Vishnu. On this day Veda Vyas and Ganesha began to write the Mahabharata. Jains celebrate this day to commemorate Tirthankara Rishabha's ending of his fast by consuming sugarcane juice poured into his cupped hands. According to Gagne (2013),  is an important festival in the Hindu calendar.

of Madhya Pradesh and Chhattisgarh
This festival of  falls in Spring. The month of  occurs during spring.

The festival lasts until Krishna Janmashtami for 13 days.

Idols of Krishna and Radha are dressed in green clothes.

of Telangana

of Gujarat
This observance is similar to the  fast. Married and unmarried women observe a fast on the day and offer the  flower (pine screw) to Parvati and Shiva.

Observance Haritalika Teej in Nepal
Dedicated to Parvati, commemorating her union with Shiva, the festival is celebrated for well-being of spouse and children and purification of one's body and soul. The festival is a three-day-long celebration that combines sumptuous feasts as well as rigid fasting.  (also romanised ) is celebrated by women, for the long life of her husband and long and firm relationship between them in this life and all the lives to come. It is particularly celebrated by women from various castes of Nepalese society, particularly the Bahun, Chettri, Kiratis and others, on the third day after the new moon of the month of Bhadra (mid-August to mid-September).

Amongst some communities it is viewed as a "festival of sisterhood", Teej has traditional and modern values as a festival of celebrating good times with siblings. Although it looks like it is celebration of sisterhood because when married women get rare chance to meet with sisters and friends from their birthplace, there is a strong role of brothers to celebrate the festival as they are to call their sisters in this auspicious occasion and cook special food for their sisters, and all the girls enjoy time doing make up to look the best and dance to forget the pain they get from their in-laws, which is expressed in the form of folk songs with particular rhythm.

Traditional values

According to Hindu mythology, Shree Swosthani Bratakatha, goddess Parvati ran away from her home with her friends to jungle as she was afraid that her father Himalaya promised to Vishnu to give his daughter Parvati in marriage. She then went to jungle and started praying Shiva to fulfill her wish to marry him. He said "" meaning he will fulfill her wish. That was the day of  when Parvati got her husband as her undying wish. So this day is celebrated to get the husband of their dream by unmarried women and for long, healthy and prosperous life of husband by married women.

First day

The first day of Teej is called . On this day the women assemble at one place in their finest attire and start dancing and singing devotional songs. Amidst all this, the grand feast takes place. What is unusual about this day is that the feast is hosted by men. Women, who work hard throughout the year, do not have to do anything that day. That is the day for them to embellish themselves in  — dressing up and using make up to the full extent, indulge in good food, and dance. Oftentimes, because women are invited by multiple brothers for the feast, they try to dance off some food before they are ready to eat more. The food served is supposed to be rich and abundant.

This is probably the only day in a year that allows women full freedom of expression. Consequently, women have traditionally used this occasion to express their pains and pang in the songs they sing while dancing. With the advancement of communication and awareness, women these days use this occasion to voice their concerns about social issues and discrimination against women. The jollity often goes on until midnight, after which the 24-hour fast starts.

Second day
The second day is the day of fasting. Some women don't eat or drink food and water while others drink liquids and eat fruit. The fasting is observed by married and unmarried women. Married women abstain strictly from food and drinks with a belief that their devotion to the gods will be blessed with longevity, peace and prosperity of their husband and family. Unmarried women observe the fast with a hope of being blessed with a good husband.

They dress gaily and visit a nearby Shiva temple singing and dancing on the way. The Pashupatinath Temple gets the highest number of devotees. The main pooja (religious ceremony) takes place with offerings of flowers, fruits, etc., made to Shiva and his wife Parvati, beseeching them to grant their blessing upon the husband and family. The important part of the puja is the oil lamp which should be alight throughout the night. It is believed that by the light of an oil lamp all night will bring peace and prosperity to the husband and family.

Third day
The third day of the festival is Rishi Panchami. After the completion of the previous day's puja, women pay homage to seven saints or sages, offer prayers to deities, and bathe with red mud found on the roots of the sacred datiwan bush, along with its leaves. The Rishi Panchami revolves around the purity of women. It is a time when women cleanse themselves of the possible "sin of touching a man during menstruation." During this festival, which occurs two days after the Teej, the women participate in ritual baths and puja (worship). One of the defining characteristics of the Teej Festival is the songs the women sing. Traditionally, these songs emphasized the subservient role of women in Nepalese society in addition to reinforcing traditional Hindu ideology of gender relations. Within the past few decades, as Nepal and the surrounding area experiences rapid development and modernization, the Teej songs have become more of a critical commentary on gender relations from women's perspectives. These songs "extend the women's thoughts and experiences of hardships from an intimate conversation to a public setting". The Teej songs allow women to effect change in their respective societies by giving them a public voice.

References

Sources 

July observances
August observances
September observances
Hindu festivals
Hindu festivals in Nepal
Festivals in Nepal
Khas culture